Anisidine can refer to any of the three possible isomers of methoxyaniline:

o-Anisidine (2-methoxyaniline)
m-Anisidine (3-methoxyaniline)
p-Anisidine (4-methoxyaniline), used in measuring anisidine value